Shauna Sand (born September 2, 1971) is an American actress and Playboy magazine's Playmate of the Month for May 1996.

Early life
Starting at age five, Sand studied ballet, jazz, and theatre. At 11, she enrolled in the School of Creative and Performing Arts in San Diego, California, and by 13, she received a dance scholarship with Ballet West in Salt Lake City, Utah.

Career
She began modeling at the age of nine. She took time off from modeling and went to Paris and enrolled briefly at the American University of Paris but dropped out. 

Sand became Playboy Playmate of the Month for May 1996. Sand began her acting career with a guest appearance on the TV show Renegade. She appeared in TV shows such as Charmed, and in movies such as the comedy The Deviants (2004). She played the main antagonist in the first three seasons of Hollywood Girls (2012 to 2014). Sand starred in Shauna Exposed, released by Vivid Entertainment.

Personal life
Sand was married to Lorenzo Lamas from 1996 to 2002.

Filmography

References

External links

 
 
 

1971 births
American television actresses
American film actresses
Living people
1990s Playboy Playmates
Actresses from San Diego
American University of Paris alumni
21st-century American women
American expatriate actresses in the United Kingdom